Dudresnaya is a genus of red algae.

The genus name of Dudresnaya is in honour of Guy-Ambroise Dudresnay (1770 - 1837), a French soldier interested in Botany and correspondent with Bonnemaison.

The genus was circumscribed by Théophile Bonnemaison in J. Phys. Chim. Hist. Nat. Arts Vol.94 on page 180 in 1822.

Taxonomy
Dudresnaya contains the following species:
 Dudresnaya verticillata
 Dudresnaya bermudensis

References

Dumontiaceae
Red algae genera